United States v. Rabinowitz, 339 U.S. 56 (1950), was a United States Supreme Court case which the Court held that warrantless searches immediately following an arrest are constitutional. The decision overturned Trupiano v. United States (1948), which had banned such searches.

Background 
Albert J. Rabinowitz was arrested in his office on February 16, 1943, for selling forged U.S. postage stamps to an undercover federal officer. Federal agents then conducted a warrantless 90 min search of the office, finding an additional 573 forged stamps. Rabinowitz unsuccessfully moved to exclude this evidence from his subsequent trial, but the motion was denied. He was convicted, but the appellate court reversed the verdict and ruled his rights under the Fourth Amendment had been violated.

Opinion of the Court 
The US Supreme Court reversed the Appeals Court ruling in a 5–3 decision. Writing for the majority, Justice Sherman Minton wrote that only "unreasonable" searches were banned under the Fourth Amendment; searching the office of a suspected forger at the site of his lawful arrest was held to be reasonable.

References

External links 

1950 in United States case law
United States Fourth Amendment case law
United States Supreme Court cases
United States Supreme Court cases of the Vinson Court